Blackburn Rovers F.C. is an English professional association football club based in the town of Blackburn, Lancashire.

Founded  on 5 November 1875, the club was one of the first to become professional. The club first played in the FA Cup in 1879 and managed to reach the final of the competition in 1882. Blackburn was one of the twelve founding member of the Football League in 1888.

The club have been champions of England three times, in 1911–12, 1913–14 and 1994–95. They have won the FA Cup six times, in 1884, 1885, 1886, 1890, 1891 and 1927–28. The club has also won one Football League Cup in 2001–02, one FA Charity Shield in 1912, and one Full Members' Cup, in 1986–87.

The club was initially managed by a committee of players whose secretary had the same powers and role as a manager has today. In 1884, Scottish-born Thomas Mitchell became secretary-manager. Under Mitchell, Blackburn won the FA Cup three times in a row; 1884, 1885 and 1886. Mitchell would guide Blackburn to a further two FA Cup wins in 1890 and 1891 before he left the club in 1896. His five FA Cups make him the most successful manager in Blackburn's history.

The longest-serving person to manage Blackburn is Robert Middleton, who was in charge of the club for 22 years and 3 months: from 1 August 1903 to 1 February 1922; a total of 605 competitive matches. During his tenure Middleton won two First Division titles (1912, 1914) and one FA Charity Shield in 1912. The shortest serving manager is Henning Berg who was manager from 31 October 2012 to 27 December 2012, a total of 57 days and 10 competitive matches.

There have been a total of 39 permanent managers at Blackburn and 5 caretakers. Two managers have held the position twice, Bob Crompton (December 1926 – February 1931 and June 1938 – March 1941) and Johnny Carey (June 1953 – October 1958 and October 1970 – June 1971), while Tony Parkes has been caretaker 4 separate times.

Every manager has come from the UK except for Johnny Carey and Owen Coyle who are both Irish, Henning Berg who is Norwegian, and Jon Dahl Tomasson who is Danish.

The club's current manager is Jon Dahl Tomasson, who took over from Tony Mowbray in June 2022.

List of managers 
Information correct after match played on 31 January 2023. Only competitive matches are counted, except the abandoned 1939–40 Football League season and matches in Wartime Leagues and Cups.

Names of caretaker managers are supplied where known, and the names of caretaker managers are highlighted in italics and marked with an asterisk (*).

Records

Nationalities
As of 14 June 2022 (including caretakers)
  English (31)
  Scottish (7)
  Irish (2)
  Danish (1)
  Norwegian (1)
  Welsh (1)

Notes

References 
Specific

 
Blackburn Rovers F.C.